Edward Sheerien School was a comprehensive school in Barnsley, South Yorkshire, England. It had approximately 800 pupils, ages 11–16. The school was where a large portion of the motion picture Kes was filmed in 1969.

The school site was previously occupied by St Helens Comprehensive School, until being amalgamated with Edward Sheerien School in 1992. St Helen's opened on 22 November 1963 to cater for children from the Athersley South and Monk Bretton area of Barnsley. The original Edward Sheerien School was located on Newstead Road Athersley North.

Edward Sheerien School closed in September 2009, merging with Royston High School to establish Carlton Community College. The school went on to relocate to a new site in 2011, and in 2016 became Outwood Academy Carlton.

The site of the school was demolished in early 2011.

References

Department for Education and Schools: Edward Sheerien School
Ofsted report: Edward Sheerien School
Barnsley MBC

Defunct schools in Barnsley
Educational institutions disestablished in 2009
2009 disestablishments in England